Wayne Davis (born March 10, 1964) is an American football former linebacker in the National Football League (NFL) who played for two seasons with the St. Louis/Phoenix Cardinals after being  drafted in the ninth round of the 1987 NFL Draft. After being released by Phoenix, Davis played for the San Francisco 49ers and Los Angeles Rams in the 1989 preseason before being drafted by the Orlando Thunder of the World League of American Football.

A native of Tuscaloosa, Alabama, Davis played college football at the University of Alabama where he established the school record for tackles in a career with 327.

His son, Ben Davis, was ranked as the No. 1 linebacker in the high school class of 2016 by ESPN, and committed to play at Alabama.

References

1964 births
Alabama Crimson Tide football players
Los Angeles Rams players
Orlando Thunder players
Phoenix Cardinals players
St. Louis Cardinals (football) players
San Francisco 49ers players
Players of American football from Alabama
Sportspeople from Tuscaloosa, Alabama
Living people